The Freedom Bowl was an annual post-season college football bowl game played at Anaheim Stadium in Anaheim, California, from 1984 to 1994. 

The bowl frequently invited a team from the Western Athletic Conference to compete against an at-large opponent, provided that the conference had enough bowl-eligible teams.

After the 1994 season, the Freedom Bowl was discontinued as the WAC’s automatic bowl bids were reduced to one with the Holiday Bowl and Cotton Bowl Classic having choice of the conference champion.

Game results

Appearances by team

Appearances by conference

See also
 List of college bowl games

References

 
Defunct college football bowls
American football in California
Recurring sporting events established in 1984
1984 establishments in California
1994 disestablishments in California